"Magenta Riddim" is a song by French DJ and record producer DJ Snake. It was released on 23 February 2018, from his second studio album Carte Blanche. The song is written and produced by DJ Snake.

Composition
The song has dancehall tunes and incorporates a number of elements from South Asian music.

Music video
The music video was uploaded on 12 April 2018, directed by Gal Muggia and Vania Heymann. It was shot in Ramoji Film City in Hyderabad India. DJ Snake joined forces with the local firefighters who can't stop dancing and as they ride around town, and companioned demonstrate fire safety techniques, then the neighbors also groove alongside them to the song's beats.

As of January 2023, the music video has received over 339 million views.

Charts

Weekly charts

Year-end charts

References

2018 songs
DJ Snake songs
Geffen Records singles
Songs written by DJ Snake